Mohsin Aziz is a Pakistani politician and a member of Senate of Pakistan, representing Pakistan Tehreek-e-Insaf.

Early life and education

Political career

He was elected to the Senate of Pakistan as a candidate of Pakistan Tehreek-e-Insaf in 2015 Pakistani Senate election.

References

Living people
Pakistani senators (14th Parliament)
Year of birth missing (living people)